A city gate is a gate which is, or was, set within a city wall. It is a type of fortified gateway.

Uses

City gates were traditionally built to provide a point of controlled access to and departure from a walled city for people, vehicles, goods and animals. Depending on their historical context they filled functions relating to defense, security, health, trade, taxation, and representation, and were correspondingly staffed by military or municipal authorities. The city gate was also commonly used to display diverse kinds of public information such as announcements, tax and toll schedules, standards of local measures, and legal texts. It could be heavily fortified, ornamented with heraldic shields, sculpture or inscriptions, or used as a location for warning or intimidation, for example by displaying the heads of beheaded criminals or public enemies.

Notably in Denmark, many market towns used to have at least one city gate mostly as part of the city's fortifications, but during the Age of Absolutism their functions become closely linked to the collection of customs, the so-called octroi, which from 1660 onwards was charged to the market town's coffers. When absolutism in Denmark came to an end after the revolutions of 1848, gate consumption was abolished in 1852, and since then the city gates also began to disappear.

Medieval Danish city gates are found today only in Vesterport, Faaborg, and Mølleporten, Stege, as well as in Flensburg, today in Germany. Further city gates, in one form or another, can be found across the world in cities dating back to ancient times to around the 19th century. Many cities would close their gates after a certain curfew each night, for example, a bigger one like Prague or a smaller one like the one in Flensburg, in the north of Germany.

With increased stability and freedom, many walled cities removed such fortifications as city gates, although many still survive; albeit for historic interest rather than security. Many surviving gates have been heavily restored, rebuilt or new ones created to add to the appearance of a city, such as Bab Bou Jalous in Fes. With increased levels of traffic, city gates have come under threat in the past for impeding the flow of traffic, such as Temple Bar in London which was removed in the 19th century.

Examples

Africa 

 Egypt: Gates of Cairo
 Morocco: 
Bab Agnaou in Marrakech
Gates of Fez

Asia

 China
 Zhengyangmen and Deshengmen in Beijing
 Gate of China in Nanjing
 city gate of Jianshui
 Cyprus: Famagusta Gate in Nicosia
 India
 Gateway of India in Mumbai (Maharashtra)
 Walled city of Jaipur in Jaipur (Rajasthan)
 Walled city and gates of Aurangabad in Aurangabad (Maharashtra)
 Walled city of Kota in Kota (Rajasthan)
 Teen Darwaza in Bhadra Fort, Ahmedabad
 Iraq: Ishtar Gate, Hillah
 Iran
 Qur'an gate (Shiraz)
 Nowbar gate (Tabriz).
 Israel: Gates in Jerusalem's Old City Walls
 Japan: Rashomon Gate, Kyoto
 Macau: Portas do Cerco - border gate for Macau with neighbouring Zhuhai
 Pakistan: Walled City of Lahore
 Philippines: Gates of Intramuros
 South Korea: Seoul's city gates, including: Namdaemun and Dongdaemun
 Taiwan: North gate of Taipei
 Yemen: Bab al Yemen of Sana'a

Europe
 Austria: Wienertor (1225/65): in Hainburg an der Donau
  Belgium:
 Brusselpoort: in Mechelen
 Waterpoort in Antwerp
 Halle Gate in Brussels
 Bosnia and Herzegovina: Višegradska kapija Višegrad gate, (also part of the old town of Vratnik) gate in Sarajevo
 Croatia: Walls of Dubrovnik
  Czech Republic:
 Powder Gate, Prague
 Písek Gate, Prague
 Zelená brána (Green Gate), Pardubice
 Brána Matky Boží, Jihlava
 Svatá brána, Kadaň
 Vysoká brána, Rakovník
 Pražská brána, Rakovník
 Denmark: Vesterport, Faaborg
 Mølleporten, Stege
 Estonia: Tallinn Gate in Pärnu
  France:
 Porte de Joigny and Porte de Sens in Villeneuve-sur-Yonne
 Porte de la Craffe in Nancy
 Porte des Allemands in Metz
 Porte Saint-Denis and Porte Saint-Martin in Paris
 Porte Mars in Reims
 Porte Cailhau in Bordeaux
 Porte de la Grosse-Horloge in La Rochelle
 Porte Mordelaise in Rennes
  Germany:
 Fünfgratturm in Augsburg
 Rotes Tor in Augsburg
 Vogeltor in Augsburg
 Wertachbrucker Tor in Augsburg
 Brandenburg Gate, in Berlin
 Eigelsteintor, Hahnentor, Ulrepforte, Severinstor in Cologne
 Nordertor, Kompagnietor and Rotes Tor in Flensburg
 Martinstor (Saint Martin's Gate) and Schwabentor in Freiburg im Breisgau
 Bayertor in Landsberg am Lech
 Holstentor, in Lübeck
 Isartor, Sendlinger Tor, Karlstor and Propylaea in Munich
 East Gate, in Regensburg
 Steintor, in Rostock
 Old Gate, in Speyer
 Porta Nigra, in Trier
 Greece: Lion Gate in Mycenae, 13th century B.C.
 Ireland: 
Saint Laurence Gate, Drogheda
Sheep Gate, Trim
St. James's Gate, Dublin
gates of Dublin
   Italy:
 Porta Galliera, Bologna
 Porta Saragozza, Bologna
 Porta Paola, Ferrara
 Pusterla di Sant'Ambrogio, in Milan
 Porta Nuova (Medieval), in Milan
 Porta Nuova, in Milan
 Porta Ticinese (Medieval), in Milan
 Porta Ticinese, in Milan
 Porta Capuana, Naples
 Porta San Gennaro, Naples
 Port'Alba, Naples
 Porta Nolana, Naples
 Porta Felice, in Palermo
 Porta Nuova, in Palermo
 Porta San Giovanni, in Rome
 Porta del Popolo, in Rome
 Porta Maggiore, in Rome
 Porta Pinciana, in Rome
 Porta Tiburtina, in Rome
 Porta San Sebastiano, in Rome
 Porta San Paolo, in Rome
 Porta Camollia, Siena
 Porta Palatina, in Turin
 Lithuania: Gate of Dawn, in Vilnius
  Malta:
 City Gate and Victoria Gate, Valletta
 Mdina Gate and Greeks Gate, Mdina
 Notre Dame Gate, Birgu
 St. Helen's Gate, Cospicua
  Netherlands:
 Amsterdamse Poort, a city gate of Haarlem
 Waterpoort (water gate), Sneek
 Vischpoort (fish gate), Elburg
 Vischpoort (fish gate), Harderwijk
 Koppelpoort (combination gate), Amersfoort
 Zijlpoort (Eastern gate), Leiden
 Koepoort (Enkhuizen), Enkhuizen
 Drommedaris, Enkhuizen
 Sassenpoort, Zwolle
 Munttoren, Amsterdam
 Eastern Gate (Delft), Delft
 Groothoofdspoort, Dordrecht
 Koornmarktspoort, Kampen
   Poland:
 Brama Floriańska (St. Florian's Gate), Kraków
 Żuraw (Crane Gate), Gdańsk
 Brama Zielona (Green Gate), Gdańsk
 Brama Wyżynna (Highland Gate), Gdańsk
 Brama Mariacka, Gdańsk
 Brama Krakowska (Kraków Gate), Lublin
 Brama Mostowa (Bridge Gate), Toruń
 Brama Klasztorna, Toruń
 Brama Opatowska, Sandomierz
 Brama Młyńska (Mill Gate), Stargard
 Brama Pyrzycka, Stargard
 Brama Garncarska, Malbork
 Brama Lidzbarska (Lidzbark Gate), Bartoszyce
 Nowa Brama (New Gate), Słupsk
 Brama Świecka, Chojna
 Brama Wolińska, Goleniów
 Brama Odrzańska, Brzeg
 Brama Portowa (Port Gate), Szczecin
 Brama Górna, Olsztyn
 Brama Szczebrzeska, Zamość
  Portugal:
 Arco da Porta Nova (Arch of the New Gate), Braga
 Portas da Cidade (City Gate), Ponta Delgada (Azores)
 Portão dos Varadouros (Beaching Gate) a.k.a. City Gate, Funchal (Madeira)
 Romania: Catherine's Gate, Brașov
 Russia
 Voskresensky Gate, Moscow
 Golden Gate, Vladimir
 Slovakia:
 Michalská brána (Michael's Gate), Bratislava
 Košická brána, Levoča
 Spain: See :Category:City gates in Spain
 Switzerland: The gates of the Basel City Walls, Basel
  Turkey
 Hadrian's Gate in Antalya
 The many gates in the walls of Constantinople, present day Istanbul
 Ukraine: Golden Gate, Kyiv
 United Kingdom: 
 Bargate Southampton
 London's Roman and Medieval gates of the London Wall: Ludgate, Newgate, Aldersgate, Bishopsgate, Cripplegate, Moorgate, Aldgate
 Westgate, Canterbury
 Eastgate, Northgate, Watergate and Bridgegate. Chester
 The gates (known as Bars) of the York city walls
 Chepstow Town Gate, Wales

Americas

 Canada: Kent Gate, Prescott Gate, Saint-Jean Gate, and Saint-Louis Gate at the ramparts of Quebec City
 Peru: Machu Picchu's gate
 Trinidad and Tobago: City Gate (Port of Spain), Port of Spain
 Uruguay: Gateway of the Citadel

See also
Defensive wall
Gate house
Gate tower
Triumphal arch
Wicket gate

References

External links

 
Types of gates